Sarah Gordon is a computer security researcher, responsible for early scientific and academic work on virus writers, hackers, and social issues in computing   She was among the first computer scientists to propose a multidisciplinary approach to computer security. Known primarily for work relating to people and computers, the bulk of her original technical work was published or presented between the late 1980s and mid-1990s.

Two of the first "concept viruses" for Microsoft products were discovered by Gordon, refuting the common belief that it was impossible to contract a virus via email. She also wrote the first report on Linux viruses in the wild. She is known for inventing the term "vX" to refer to Virus Exchange. Gordon has always been fascinated with linguistics, and has introduced several other terms into the computer lexicon,  including "trigger foot" and "meaningfulness".

Dr. Gordon was appointed to the computer science graduate faculty of the Florida Institute of Technology  in 2004. Although she has worked for several computer security companies, including Dr. Solomon's Software, Command Software, IBM Research, and Symantec Corporation, her work has continued to be primarily academic. Sarah Gordon is an alumnus of Indiana University South Bend, where she obtained a Bachelor of Science degree in 1997. She has a master's degree in Human Behaviour and Professional Counseling, and a Ph.D in Computer Science from Middlesex University.

External links 
 Sarah Gordon's personal website

References 

Living people
Computer security academics
American computer scientists
American women computer scientists
Florida Institute of Technology faculty
IBM Research computer scientists
Gen Digital people
Indiana University South Bend alumni
Alumni of Middlesex University
Year of birth missing (living people)
American women academics
21st-century American women